Fenzhongsi  in Beijing. It is the starting point of the Jingjintang Expressway to Langfang, Tianjin and Tanggu, and has been served by Fenzhongsi station of the Beijing Subway since the end of 2012. Fenzhongsi lies on the southeastern segment of the 3rd Ring Road.

References

Transport in Fengtai District